Oregon Health & Science University's (OHSU) Center for Health & Healing is a  medical building in the South Waterfront district of Portland, Oregon. It is connected to the main OHSU campus on Marquam hill by the Portland Aerial Tram.

History
The OHSU Center for Health & Healing was completed in 2006, designed by GBD Architects and constructed by Hoffman Construction. It took 3 years to complete, with construction beginning in 2003, and cost a total of $140 million. In February 2007, the building was granted LEED Platinum status, becoming the largest health care facility in the United States to earn LEED's highest rating.

Details

Of the facility’s 16 floors, eight floors are dedicated to physician practice, surgery, and imaging; three floors house the March Wellness Fitness Center; four are home to education and research facilities; and the ground level contains an optical shop, a pharmacy, and a café.

See also
Architecture of Portland, Oregon
List of hospitals in Portland, Oregon

References

External links 
 
 AIA article

Skyscrapers in Portland, Oregon
Leadership in Energy and Environmental Design platinum certified buildings
Oregon Health & Science University
2006 establishments in Oregon
South Portland, Portland, Oregon